Abington Township is a township in Montgomery County, Pennsylvania, United States. It is adjacent to Philadelphia's northern fringe. The population was 58,502 as of the 2020 census, making it the second most populous township in Montgomery County after Lower Merion Township. The population density is 3603.3 per square mile (1,377/km2), making it the second most densely populated township in Montgomery County after Cheltenham Township).

Abington Township is one of Montgomery County's oldest communities, dating back  before 1700 and being incorporated in 1704. It is home to some of the county's oldest transportation routes, industries and churches. Many of these older business and transportation centers were the forerunners of modern Abington. Abington contains the Willow Grove Park Mall, several small businesses, and a few of Montgomery County's largest employers.

History

The land that comprises Abington today was purchased from the native Lenape by William Penn during the 1680s. By the next decade, a handful of European settlers built and lived in Hill Township, at the crossroads of Susquehanna Street Road and Old York Road. After brief times under other names, the township incorporated as Abington in 1704. The town's name is likely taken from parishes in England formed over 900 years ago in Northamptonshire or Cambridgeshire. A local 1734 census counted 42 resident landowners. During the American Revolutionary War, there was a small battle that took place at Edge Hill.

Some institutions have been in Abington for most of its existence. The cornerstone of the original Abington Friends School, in operation since before Abington's incorporation, is used in today's school building. The Abington Presbyterian Church opened in the early years of the township, and while the original building is gone, its graveyard is still used today.

The railroad reached the township in 1855, with the first station building erected in 1873 on the site of today's Noble Station.

Abington Township High School and Fox Chase Farm are listed on the National Register of Historic Places.

Geography

Communities
Abington Township comprises fifteen "communities" as follow alphabetically:

Communities:
 Abington 
 Ardsley
 Crestmont
 Elkins Park
 Fitzwatertown
 Glenside
 Hollywood
 Huntingdon Valley
 McKinley
 Meadowbrook
 Noble
 North Hills
 Roslyn
 Roychester
 Rydal
 Willow Grove

The communities are unofficial, unincorporated subdivisions of the township, corresponding roughly to voting districts and elementary school placement. Their primary importance, aside from community identity, is the postal system (e.g., to send a letter to someone living in the Glenside community, the letter would be addressed to Glenside, Pennsylvania rather than Abington Township, Pennsylvania). Additionally, some portions of some of these subdivisions, including Glenside, Huntingdon Valley, North Hills, Willow Grove, and Elkins Park, are actually in neighboring townships.

Local civic associations include Crestmont Civic Association, Glenside Gardens Civic Association, Hollywood Civic Association, Lower Huntingdon Valley Civic Association, McKinley Civic Association, Rydal-Meadowbrook Civic Association and Tall Trees Association. The civic associations work together on Traffic Summits in even years (2012, 2014, 2016, etc.) and Economic Summits in odd years (2013, 2015, 2017, etc.). These Summits focus on eliminating traffic congestion that interferes with the growth of businesses in the Township. Pennsylvania Department of Transportation's Traffic Calming Handbook recommends the formation of a Local Traffic Advisory Committee to work with officials to identify ways to improve safety of the community.

Demographics

As of the 2010 census, the township was 79.7% White, 12.4% Black or African American, 0.1% Native American, 4.9% Asian, and 2.1% were two or more races. 3.2% of the population were of Hispanic or Latino ancestry.

As of 2008, the U.S. Census Bureau estimated there were 55,234 people, 21,252 occupied households, and 14,819 families residing in the township. The population density was 3,563 people per square mile (1,377/km2). The racial makeup of the township was 80% White, 12% Black, 3% Asian, a fraction of a percent Pacific Islander, 1% from other races, and 3% from two or more races. Hispanic or Latino of any race were 3% of the population.

There were 21,252 households, out of which 32% had children under the age of 18 living with them, 11% had a female householder with no husband present, 56% were married couples living together, and 30% were non-families. 26% of all households were made up of individuals, and 12% had someone living alone who was 65 years of age or older.  The average household size was 2.56 and the average family size was 3.11.

In the township, the population was spread out, with 22% under the age of 18, 9% from 18 to 24, 25% from 25 to 44, 29% from 45 to 64, and 16% who were 65 years of age or older. The median age was 42 years. The population was 47% male, and 53% female.

The median income for a household in the township was $77,363, and the median income for a family was $94,473. The per capita income for the township was $38,737. About 2% of families and 3% of the population were below the poverty line, including 1% of those under age 18 and 5% of those age 65 or over.

Government

Abington Township does not have a mayor. Rather it is governed by a Board of Commissioners who are elected one from each of the township's fifteen wards. A President of the Board is elected from among these commissioners, and serves as the head of government for Abington Township. Thomas Hecker is the current Commission President.

All of the township is in the Fourth Congressional District and is represented by Rep. Madeleine Dean (D).

All of the township falls within the 4th Senatorial District in the Pennsylvania Senate and is Represented by Art Haywood (D).

All of the township falls within the 153rd Legislative District in the PA House of Representatives and is represented by Ben Sanchez (D).

In 2004, Pennsylvanian political scientists Dr. G. Terry Madonna and Dr. Michael Young identified Abington Township as an especially interesting political bellwether — a local area "looked to for early readings of how national elections will turn out."

Economy
The economy of the township includes manufacturing of pressed steel, chemicals, and metal and plastic products.

Top employers
According to Abington Township's 2012 Comprehensive Annual Financial Report, the top employers in the township are:

Infrastructure

Transportation

Numbered routes serving Abington Township include Pennsylvania Route 611, which passes north–south through the center of the township on Old York Road between Jenkintown and Willow Grove; Pennsylvania Route 63, which passes northwest–southeast through the northern part of the township in the Willow Grove area along Moreland Road (following the border with Upper Moreland Township), Edge Hill Road, and Old Welsh Road; Pennsylvania Route 73; which runs northwest–southeast atop the southern border with Cheltenham Township along Township Line Road between Jenkintown and Northeast Philadelphia; Pennsylvania Route 152, which passes north–south through the western part of the township along Limekiln Pike; and Pennsylvania Route 232; which passes north–south through the eastern part of the township along Huntingdon Pike between Rockledge and Huntingdon Valley. Other important roads in Abington Township include Easton Road, which runs southwest–northeast through the western part of the township between Glenside and Willow Grove; Susquehanna Road, which runs northwest–southeast  through the center of the township between Roslyn and Huntingdon Valley; and Jenkintown Road, which runs northwest–southeast through the southern part of the township between Ardsley and Elkins Park, passing through Jenkintown along the way. Abington Township is one of twelve municipalities in Pennsylvania to have red light cameras, which are aimed at improving safety at dangerous intersections. Red light cameras are located at Old York Road and Susquehanna Road (all directions), Old York Road and Old Welsh Road (all directions), and Moreland Road and Fitzwatertown Road (eastbound Moreland Road and northbound Fitzwatertown Road).

Several SEPTA Regional Rail stations are located in Abington Township, providing commuter rail service to Center City Philadelphia. The Lansdale/Doylestown Line stops at the North Hills station, the Warminster Line stops at Crestmont, Roslyn, and Ardsley stations, and the West Trenton Line stops at Meadowbrook, Rydal, and Noble stations. The Glenside station serving the Lansdale/Doylestown Line and Warminster Line is located just outside the township's borders in Cheltenham Township.

Utilities
Electricity and natural gas in Abington Township is provided by PECO Energy Company, a subsidiary of Exelon. Water in Abington Township is provided by Aqua Pennsylvania, a subsidiary of Aqua America. Sewer service is provided by the township's Wastewater Utilities Department, with wastewater treated either at the Abington Wastewater Treatment Plant or the Philadelphia Northeast Treatment Plant. Trash and recycling collection is provided by the township's Refuse/Recycling Department. Cable, telephone, and internet service to the area is provided by Xfinity and Verizon. Abington Township is served by area codes 215, 267, and 445.

Health care

Jefferson Abington Hospital and Holy Redeemer Hospital and are both located in Abington Township. Jefferson Abington Hospital, located along Old York Road in the Abington section of the township, has 665 beds and over 5,500 employees, including more than 1,100 physicians, and is one of the largest employers in Montgomery County. It has the Pennock Emergency Trauma Center, an emergency room with the only Level II trauma center in Montgomery County. Other services offered at Jefferson Abington Hospital include The Heart and Vascular Institute, The Sidney Kimmel Cancer Center at Jefferson Health-Abington, Neurosciences Institute, Orthopaedic and Spine Institute, Diamond Stroke Center, Muller Institute for Senior Health, and the Institute for Metabolic and Bariatric Surgery. Jefferson Abington Hospital is a non-profit, regional referral center and teaching hospital with five residency programs and operates the Dixon School of Nursing. Holy Redeemer Hospital, located along Huntingdon Pike in the Meadowbrook section of the township, has 242 beds and employs over 500 physicians. Services offered at Holy Redeemer Hospital include an Ambulatory Surgery Center, a Cardiovascular Center, The Bott Cancer Center, Orthopaedics, Emergency Department, and Wound Care Center.

Education

Schools
Abington is served by the Abington School District. There are seven elementary schools in this township, which include:
 Copper Beech (1,156 students)
 McKinley (754)
 Rydal (636)
 Highland (500)
 Overlook (587)
 Roslyn (511)
 Willow Hill (425)

The junior high (grades 7–9) is Abington Junior High School (1,960 students) and the senior high (grades 10–12) is Abington Senior High School (1,808).

There are several private schools located inside the township, such as Meadowbrook and Abington Friends School. Penn State's Abington campus is located in the Rydal section of the township.

The school district received some notoriety in the 1960s when it became one of the key parties in the school prayer controversy, with Abington School District v. Schempp. The Supreme Court case resulted in a declaration of the unconstitutionality of school-sanctioned Bible reading.

The Elementary Schools, Junior High School, and Senior High school within Abington School District have recently undergone a series of renovations and rebuilding, resulting in more up-to-date and sophisticated structures.

Area Catholic schools include Saint Luke Catholic School in Glenside and Abington Township, and Queen of Angels Regional Catholic School in Willow Grove and Upper Moreland Township. Queen of Angels was formed in 2012 by the merger of Our Lady Help of Christians in Abington and St. David in Willow Grove.

Penn State opened the Ogontz Campus in 1950, which was renamed to Penn State Abington.

Notable people
 Polly Apfelbaum – visual artist
 Gail Berman – former president of entertainment at Fox Broadcasting Company and former president of Viacom's Paramount Pictures
 Amar Gopal Bose – MIT professor and founder of the audio company Bose Corporation
 David Brumbaugh – former Oklahoma state legislator
 Michael Buffer – ring announcer
 Ashton Carter – physicist, Harvard University professor, and former United States Secretary of Defense
 Bradley Cooper – actor
 Madeleine Dean – current U.S. Representative from Pennsylvania
 Krista Errickson – actress
 Maddy Evans – retired National Women's Soccer League midfielder and defender
 Tom Feeney – former U.S. Representative from Florida
 Jon D. Fox – former U.S. Representative from Pennsylvania
 Matthew Fox – actor, famous for his portrayal of "Jack" on Lost
 Jason Garrett – retired NFL quarterback, offensive coordinator of the New York Giants, and former head coach of the Dallas Cowboys
 Eddie George – retired NFL running back
 Drew Gulak – professional wrestler
 Joe Hoeffel – former U.S. Representative from Pennsylvania
 Al Holbert – auto racer in Motorsports Hall of Fame of America
 Deborah Kaplan – screenwriter and film director
 Bil Keane – cartoonist of The Family Circus; resided in Roslyn with his family from 1948 to 1959
 Chad Kolarik – University of Michigan hockey player, drafted by the Phoenix Coyotes
 William Lashner – novelist
 Joey Lawrence – actor
 Matthew Lawrence – actor
 Andrew Lawrence - actor
 Benjamin Lay – philanthropist and abolitionist
 Stephen Lynch – Tony Award-nominated actor, comedian and musician
 James Morrow – science fiction author, born in the area and alludes to the case in his novel Blameless in Abaddon, whose title community is a parallel of Abington
 Jeff Parke – current Major League Soccer player
 Kyle Pitts – current (as of 2021) NFL tight end, drafted 1st round 4th overall in the 2021 NFL Draft
 Mike Richter – retired NHL goaltender
 Mike Rossi – DJ and former TV host who cheated in the Lehigh Valley marathon
 Bob Saget – actor and comedian
 Ellery Schempp – physicist; famous for his involvement as a student in Abington School District v. Schempp
 Allyson Schwartz – former U.S. Representative from Pennsylvania
 Stephen A. Schwarzman – chairman, CEO and co-founder of Blackstone Group
 Susan Seidelman – film and television director, Desperately Seeking Susan, Sex And The City
 Josh Shapiro – 48th and current Governor of Pennsylvania
 David Starr – professional wrestler
 Kenny Vasoli – lead singer and bassist of The Starting Line and Vacationer
 Mike Vogel – actor, known for his roles in the films Grind and The Texas Chainsaw Massacre
 ZZ Ward – musician, singer/songwriter
 Danny Woodburn – actor, comedian 
 Shawn Wooden – retired NFL safety for the Miami Dolphins

References

External links

 Abington Township, Montgomery County, Pennsylvania – official website
 History of Abington, Cheltenham, Douglas, Franconia & Frederick, Pa.

1704 establishments in Pennsylvania
Populated places established in 1704
Townships in Montgomery County, Pennsylvania